Tomas Nordin (born 9 October 1969) is a Swedish curler and world champion.

Born in Härnösand, Sweden, Nordin won a gold medal in the 1997, 2001 and 2004 World Curling Championships, all three times with skip Peja Lindholm, and received silver medal in 1998 and 2000.

He is European champion from 1998 and 2001 (with skip Peja Lindholm), and has received a total of seven medals in the European championships.

In 1998 he was inducted into the Swedish Curling Hall of Fame.

References

External links
 

1969 births
Living people
People from Härnösand
Swedish male curlers
World curling champions
Swedish curling champions
Curlers at the 2002 Winter Olympics
Curlers at the 2006 Winter Olympics
Olympic curlers of Sweden
Continental Cup of Curling participants
European curling champions
Sportspeople from Västernorrland County
20th-century Swedish people
21st-century Swedish people